New Japan Cup USA is an annual professional wrestling tournament produced by New Japan Pro-Wrestling (NJPW). The tournament is a spin-off of NJPW's annual New Japan Cup introduced in 2020. The tournament was promoted under NJPW's North American branch, New Japan Pro-Wrestling of America.

New Japan Cup USA is an eight-man, single-elimination tournament. Matches are contested through NJPW's weekly television show, Strong.

Tournaments

History
The New Japan Cup was first held in April 2005. The event then became an annual tradition for NJPW and was held every year around mid-March to mid-April, with the winner receiving a match for the IWGP Heavyweight Championship. After the 2020 edition of the New Japan Cup was delayed until June due to the COVID-19 pandemic, it was announced during a press conference on July 31 that the New Japan Cup USA would take place from August 7 to August 21 of that year, with the winner receiving a shot at the IWGP United States Heavyweight Championship. It was also reported that the matches would be televised on NJPW's new television show, Strong. The next day, the eight-man bracket was announced.

Editions

2020

It commenced on August 7, 2020 and concluded on August 21, 2020.

2021

New Japan Cup USA 2021 commenced on April 9 and concluded on April 23. Eight qualifying matches were held from March 5–March 26 to determine the eight participants. The bracket was revealed after the eight participants were determined. Originally, the winner of the tournament would receive an IWGP United States Championship title match, but this was changed when NJPW revealed the Strong Openweight Championship on April 2 and announced that the winner will become its inaugural champion instead.

See also
New Japan Cup

Notes

References

External links
Official New Japan Pro-Wrestling website

New Japan Pro-Wrestling tournaments
New Japan Pro-Wrestling shows
Professional wrestling in California